Kurt Hubert Franz (17 January 1914 – 4 July 1998) was an SS officer and one of the commanders of the Treblinka extermination camp. Because of this, Franz was one of the major perpetrators of genocide during the Holocaust. Sentenced to life imprisonment in the Treblinka Trials in 1965, he was eventually released in 1993.

The verdict against Franz stated that "a large part of the streams of blood and tears that flowed in Treblinka can be attributed to him alone."

Early career
Kurt Franz was born in 1914 in Düsseldorf.  He attended public school in Düsseldorf from 1920 to 1928, and then worked as a messenger and as a cook. Franz's father, a merchant, died early. His mother was an observant Catholic.  When she remarried, it was to a man with a strong right-wing nationalist outlook.  Franz joined several right-wing national groups and served in the voluntary labor corps.  He also trained with a master butcher for one year.

Franz joined the Nazi Party in 1932, and was conscripted in the German Army in 1935.  After performing the military service in October 1937, he joined the SS-Totenkopfverbände.  First he received training with the Third Death Head Regiment Thuringia at Weimar, and then served as cook and guard at the Buchenwald concentration camp, where he attained the rank of Unterscharführer (Corporal).

Action T4
In late 1939 Franz was summoned to Hitler's Chancellery and detailed to take part in the Action T4 euthanasia program.  Franz worked as a cook at Hartheim, Brandenburg, Grafeneck and Sonnenstein.  In late 1941, he was assigned as cook at T4 headquarters.

On 20 April 1942, Franz was promoted to Oberscharführer (Staff Sergeant).  In spring of 1942, Franz, along with other veterans of Action T4, went to Lublin concentration camp complex in the Generalgouvernement, and was posted to the Bełżec extermination camp, where he stayed until the end of August 1942.

Treblinka

With a change of command in the Operation Reinhard death camp system, Franz was transferred to Treblinka extermination camp.  He quickly became the camp's deputy commandant on the orders of Christian Wirth. He was promoted to serve as the last camp commandant from mid August until November 1943 to conclude the Holocaust in Poland.

In the testimony (27 February 1946) of one  at the major war crimes trial held in Nuremberg, Franz was "the commander of the camp" and orchestrated the building of the railway station at Treblinka.  Rajzman said, "When the persons descended from the trains, they really had the impression that they were at a very good station from where they could go to Suwalki, Vienna, Grodno, or other cities." Rajzman also stated that Franz was responsible for the death of renowned psychologist Sigmund Freud's sister.

At first, Kurt Franz supervised work commandos, the unloading of transports, and the transfer of Jews from the undressing rooms to the gas chambers.  Franz had a baby-like face, and for this he was nicknamed "Lalke" ("doll" in Yiddish) by the prisoners.  But Franz's appearance belied his true nature.  He was the dominant overseer in day-to-day interactions with prisoners in Treblinka, and he became the most feared man at Treblinka for the cruelty which he visited upon them.

Facts prove otherwise. Despite visible damage to the camp during the revolt, the gas chambers were left intact and the killing of Polish Jews under Kurt Franz continued, albeit at a reduced speed with only ten boxcars "processed" at a time until the last transport of victims arrived on 19 August with 7,600 survivors of the Białystok Ghetto Uprising. Franz followed Globocnik to Trieste in November 1943.

Barry the dog
Franz was known for being unusually cruel and sadistic.  He often made his rounds of the camp riding a horse, and would take his St. Bernard dog, Barry, along with him.  Barry was trained to follow Franz's command, which was usually to bite the genitalia or buttocks of prisoners.

Barry's first owner was Paul Groth, an SS officer at Sobibor.  Depending on his mood, Franz would set the dog on inmates who for some reason had attracted his attention.  The command to which the dog responded was, "Man, grab that dog!"—by "man", Franz meant the dog Barry, and the "dog" was the human inmate whom Barry was supposed to attack, in an effort at dehumanization.  Barry would bite his victim wherever he could catch him.  The dog was the size of a calf so that, unlike smaller dogs, his shoulders would reach to the buttocks and abdomen of a man of average size.  For this reason, he frequently bit his victims in the buttocks, in the abdomen and often, in the case of male inmates, in the genitals, sometimes partially biting them off.  When the inmate was not very strong, the dog could knock him to the ground and maul him beyond recognition.

When Kurt Franz was not around, Barry was a different dog.  With Franz not there to influence him, the dog allowed himself to be petted and even teased, without harming anyone.

The Treblinka song
As reported by lower-ranking SS officers and soldiers, Kurt Franz also wrote the lyrics to a song which celebrated the Treblinka extermination camp. Prisoner Walter Hirsch wrote them for him. This song was taught to the few newly arriving Jews who were not killed immediately and were instead forced to work as slave laborers at the camp.  These Jews were forced to memorize the song by nightfall of their first day at the camp.  The melody for the song came from an SS officer at Buchenwald concentration camp.  The music was written in a happy way, as though the deaths were a joyful process rather than one of mourning, in the key of D major.  Franz's lyrics for the song are listed below:

Further torment of prisoners
Kurt Franz reviewed the prisoner roll call and participated in meting out punishments.  For instance, when seven prisoners attempted to escape the camp, Franz had them taken to the Lazarett and shot.  He ordered a roll call and announced that if there were further attempted escapes, and especially if they were successful, ten prisoners would be shot for every escapee.

Franz enjoyed shooting at prisoners or those still in the rail cars with his pistol or a hunting rifle.  He frequently selected bearded men from the newly arriving transports and asked them whether they believed in God.  When the men replied "yes", Franz told each man to hold up a bottle as a target.  He would then say to them, "If your God indeed exists, then I will hit the bottle, and if He does not exist, then I will hit you."  Then Franz would shoot at them.

Kurt Franz also had experience as a boxer before arriving at Treblinka.  He put this training to sadistic use by victimizing Jews as punching bags.  On occasion he would "challenge" a Jew to a boxing duel (of course the prisoner had to oblige), and gave the prisoner a boxing glove, while keeping one for himself, to give the illusion of a fair fight.  But Franz kept a small pistol in the glove that he kept for himself, and he would proceed to shoot the prisoner dead once the gloves were on and they had assumed the starting boxing position.

Oscar Strawczinski wrote:

In the 1964 trial, a witness gave testimony:  "Describing his sufferings at the hands of ex-camp commander Kurt Franz and nine other defendants, Abraham Goldfarb, 55, said he once saw Franz join a group of Jewish children in play just before they were gassed. He said he heard Franz say at the time that children were “all headed for heaven.” He also said that the German guards would cut open pregnant Jewish women after they were gassed to make sure 'the fruit of their wombs' were also dead."

Franz was promoted to Untersturmführer (Second Lieutenant) and became an appointed official on 21 June 1943 on the orders of Heinrich Himmler.  On 2 August 1943, Franz along with four SS men and sixteen Ukrainians went for a swim in the nearby Bug River, which depleted the security at Treblinka significantly and helped to improve the chances of success of the prisoner revolt that took place at the camp that day.  After the revolt, the camp's commandant Franz Stangl left.  Kurt Franz served as his replacement, and he was instructed to dismantle the camp and to eliminate every trace of evidence that it had ever existed.  Franz had at his disposal some SS men, a group of Ukrainian guards and about 100 Jewish prisoners who had remained after the uprising.  The physical work was carried out by the Jews during September and October 1943, after which thirty to fifty prisoners were sent to Sobibor to finish dismantling there, and the remainder were shot and cremated on Franz's orders.

After Treblinka, in late autumn 1943, Franz was ordered to Trieste and northern Italy, where he participated in the persecution of partisans and Jews until the war's end. He was wounded in late 1944 and, after recovery, employed as security officer on the Görz-Trieste railway line.

Post-war trial and conviction
Following the war, Kurt Franz first worked as a laborer on bridges until 1949, at which point he returned to his former occupation as a cook and worked in Düsseldorf for 10 years until his arrest on 2 December 1959.  A search of his home found a photo album of Treblinka with the title, "Beautiful Years".

Separate indictments included:

V.
 Slaughtering a child 
 Shooting a child and his parents 
 Killing an infant 
 Killing an infant in the women's dressing area 
 Killing another infant in the women's dressing area 
 Shooting of an 18-year-old Jewish woman in a hospital
 Killing a Jew with a rifle butt 
 The death of the Jewess Inka Salzwasser
 Killing an old Jew 
 Killing another old Jew

VI.
 Shooting of at least 10 prisoners in early September 1942 in retaliation for the attack on Max Biala
 Selection of at least 80 working Jews the day after the death of Max Biala and their transfer to the shooting in the military hospital
 Shooting of the Itzek Choncinsky on the latrine  
 Death of the Jewish doctor Roland Choranzicky 
 Injury of a prisoner from a shot with the hunting rifle and its liquidation in the hospital  
 Death of Hans Burg  
 Shooting of 7 inmates  
 Shooting of a prisoner who removed his Star of David  
 Shooting of a young prisoner in the upper camp  
 Shooting of inmates Chaim Edelmann, Jakob Edelmann and Salk Wolfowicz  
 Shooting of two prisoners in the military hospital for sport  
 Shooting of a prisoner in the military hospital, which he had previously injured by a lashing on the eye  
 Shooting of the prisoner Eliasz Adlerstein in the upper camp  
 Shooting of the prisoner Mendel Nuessenbaum in the upper camp from his horse 
 Killing of a prisoner in the military hospital, who had previously been injured by a shot in the hip  
 Shooting of a prisoner bitten by Barry in the hospital  
 Hanging of a prisoner in the upper camp  
 Liquidation of the prisoner from at least 25 persons of the Restkommando still alive at end of November 1943

VII.
 The death of the young coachman  
 Shooting of a prisoner in the military hospital previously abused on the beating bench  
 Shooting of a prisoner on the sorting station  
 Shooting of a prisoner for a piece of bread 
 Shooting of a prisoner near the carrot bed  
 Shooting of a prisoner for attempted suicide  
 Killing of a young working Jew in the execution of grading on the sorting station  
 Shooting of a prisoner in the infirmary who wanted to give water to the Goldjuden* Stern  
 Killing of a Young Prisoner near the potato camp  
 Hanging of the Prisoner Sklarczyk  
 Whipping and killing of a prisoner in the lower camp  
 Hanging of three prisoners

VIII.
 The death of a man who did not want to go to the upper camp 
 The killing of a working Jew by the sorting command due to several abdominal shots and a shot in the head 
 Hanging of two inmates, one of them was called Langner 
 The shooting of the boxer from Krakow 
 Shooting of three inmates of the sorting command 
 The hanging of three inmates for conspiracy 
 The hanging of two prisoners who wanted to flee in a loaded freight car 
 Killing of a young Goldjuden 
 Shooting of a logger in the death camp 
 Fatal mangling of a prisoner by the dog Barry near the so-called "cash register"
 The killing of prisoners from the kitchen of the Ukrainians by Barry 
 The death of the Latrinenkapo 
 The killing of several prisoners in bottle-shooting 
 The killing of a prisoner who had arrived too late in the Appell (Appellplatz)  
 The killing of 12 inmates of the wood chipper command 
 The shooting of the Częstochowa Stajer 
 Shooting of about 350 prisoners by volleys from submachine guns 
 Shooting of a Polish farmer

At the Treblinka Trials in 1965, Franz denied having ever killed a person, having ever set his dog on a Jew, and claimed to have only beaten a prisoner once.  On 3 September he was found guilty of collective murder of at least 300,000 people, 35 counts of murder involving at least 139 people, and for attempted murder.  He was sentenced to life imprisonment.  He was released in 1993 for health reasons. Kurt Franz died in Wuppertal in 1998. In 2014, the New England Holocaust Institute and Museum acquired Kurt Franz's uniform.

Franz's Decorations: War Merit Cross 2nd Class With Swords, Heer Long Service Medal, Sudetenland Medal.

References

External links
 Kurt Franz biography at Olokaustos. 
 Franz interview in a German publication after release from prison, date and name of publication unknown.

1914 births
1998 deaths
Military personnel from Düsseldorf
Aktion T4 personnel
Belzec extermination camp personnel
German prisoners sentenced to life imprisonment
Nazi concentration camp commandants
People convicted in the Treblinka trials
People paroled from life sentence
Prisoners sentenced to life imprisonment by Germany
SS-Untersturmführer
Treblinka extermination camp personnel
People from the Rhine Province
Holocaust perpetrators in Poland
German people convicted of murder
German people convicted of attempted murder